Antonio Michele Stanca (22 May 1942 – 19 March 2020) was an Italian geneticist.

He was born in Soleto, Italy. He graduated in University of Bari, majoring in agricultural science. He had been a professor at the University of Milan, Università Cattolica del Sacro Cuore of Piacenza,  (INAT) of Tunis, and the University of Modena and Reggio Emilia.

During the COVID-19 pandemic, he died of COVID-19 on 19 March 2020 in Fidenza, aged 77.

References

1942 births
2020 deaths
People from the Province of Lecce
Italian geneticists
Academic staff of the Università Cattolica del Sacro Cuore
Academic staff of the University of Milan
University of Bari alumni
Deaths from the COVID-19 pandemic in Emilia-Romagna